The Sussex Thunder are an American football team from England based in Brighton, Sussex. The club entered the league for the first time in 1997 when the Crawley Raiders merged with local rivals the Brighton B52s to form a new club – Sussex Thunder under inaugural Head Coach Jim Jasicki. The Thunder reached the BritBowl Final in their second year led by current Head Coach Ian Ellis, narrowly losing to the London Olympians. Success continued to allude the club afterwards, but on 20 September 2008, led by Head Coach Len Scott, the Thunder won the Division 1 national championship in an overtime win against the Redditch Arrows.

Promotion to the BAFL Premier Division in 2009 saw the Thunder struggle to a losing season and the departure of two Head Coaches during that season (Len Scott and then Jim Roberson).

In November 2009, the Sussex Thunder appointed ex-San Francisco 49ers trialist Tony Stitt as head coach and under his guidance won promotion back to the Premier Division of the BAFA National Leagues. After two seasons in the Premier Division, the club returned to the BAFA National Leagues Division 1 South, and re-hired Ian Ellis. A Play-off run followed in 2011 (where they lost to the Birmingham bulls 14–13) before the club once again claimed the Division 1 National Championship in 2012.

Due to a large amount of senior player retirements, the Thunder withdrew from the league for the 2014 season and then entered the associate process to rejoin the league in the 2015 season. Membership was approved by the league and in 2015 the team re entered the Division 2 South East Conference. After a successful season in 2015 ending in a Semi Final defeat in Triple Overtime to eventual Division 2 Champions the Thunder were awarded promotion to Division 1 SFC South for 2016.

2021 Executive Committee 
 Sergey Kumin (chairman)
Lianne Wilkinson (Vice Chairman)
Jan Pester (Co-Treasurer)
Steve Pester (Co-Treasurer)
Rhys Parfitt (Welfare Officer)
Heidi Nesbit
Callum Graham

2021 Coaching Staff 

 Head Coach – Ian Ellis
 Head Coach Assistant – Lianne Wilkinson

Offensive Coaches 

 Offensive Coordinator – Malcolm Bamsey

 Quarterbacks – Charles Jasicki
 Wide Receivers – Craig Dowsett-Browse
 Running Backs – Gus Romain
 Running Backs Assistant – Adam Hart
 Offensive Line – Robert Carter
 Offensive Line Assistant – Billy Walker

Defensive Coaches 

 Defensive Coordinator – Neil Chiorda
 Defensive Backs – Keir Macree
 Defensive Backs Assistant – Jake Maxted
 Linebackers – Ian Ellis
 Linebackers Assistant – Tom Harris
 Defensive Line – Karl Filmer-Sankey

Special Team Coaches 

 Special Teams Coordinator – Lee Philips
 Special Teams Assistant – Paul Mays
 Special Teams Assistant – Jake Maxted

Retired numbers
 26 Andy Smythe
 56 Adrian Teague

References

External links
Official website

BAFA National League teams
American football teams in England